The 1971 Baltimore Colts season was the 19th season for the team in the National Football League. Led by second-year head coach Don McCafferty, the Colts appeared to be on the verge of winning the AFC East again after beating the Miami Dolphins 14–3 in the penultimate game of the regular season. However, the Colts lost the final game of the season at home to the New England Patriots, dropping them to 10–4 and the wild card berth. They lost to the Dolphins in the AFC Championship game. The Baltimore defense gave up a total of 140 points for 14 regular season (10 PPG) & in their four defeats, they lost by 15 points total.

This was the final season under the ownership of Carroll Rosenbloom, who traded franchises with the Los Angeles Rams in July 1972, with players and coaching staffs remaining intact.

Offseason

NFL draft

Personnel

Staff/coaches

Roster

Regular season

Schedule

Game summaries

Week 1

Standings

Postseason 

The team made it to the playoffs as a No. 4 seed and traveled to Cleveland to play the Cleveland Browns in the divisional round. The Colts led 14–0 at the half and would cruise to a 20–3 win. They then traveled south to play the Miami Dolphins and tried to make it to their second consecutive Super Bowl. Colts QB Johnny Unitas was intercepted three times as they were shut out 21–0.

See also 
 History of the Indianapolis Colts
 Indianapolis Colts seasons
 Colts–Patriots rivalry

References 

Baltimore Colts
1971
Baltimore Colts